İsmayılabad (also, Ismailabad) is a village in the Yevlakh Rayon of Azerbaijan. The village forms part of the municipality of Səmədabad.

References 

Populated places in Yevlakh District